Biohappiness, or bio-happiness, is the elevation of wellbeing in humans through biological methods, including germline engineering through screening embryos with genes associated with a high level of happiness, or the use of drugs intended to raise baseline levels of happiness. The object is to facilitate the achievement of a state of "better than well."

Proponents of biohappiness include the transhumanist philosopher David Pearce, whose goal is to end the suffering of all sentient beings and the Canadian ethicist Mark Alan Walker. Walker has sought to defend biohappiness on the grounds that happiness ought to be of interest to a wide range of moral theorists; and that hyperthymia, a state of high baseline happiness, is associated with better outcomes in health and human achievement. 

The concept of biohappiness also has its high-profile critics, including Leon Kass, who served on the President's Council on Bioethics during the presidency of George W. Bush.

See also 
Eradication of suffering
Perfectionism (philosophy)

References

External links
The Biohappiness Revolution (video)
Beyond Therapy: Biotechnology and the Pursuit of Happiness (The President's Council on Bioethics, Washington, D.C., October 2003).

Bioethics
Biotechnology
Hedonism
Neuropharmacology
Transhumanism
Utilitarianism